Fanette Humair (born 8 October 1991) is a Swiss athlete. She competed in the women's 4 × 400 metres relay event at the 2019 World Athletics Championships.

References

External links

1991 births
Living people
Swiss female sprinters
Place of birth missing (living people)
World Athletics Championships athletes for Switzerland